Bernard Goldsmith (November 20, 1832 – July 22, 1901) was a Bavarian-American businessman and politician. He is best remembered as the 19th mayor of Portland, Oregon, serving from 1869 to 1871, and as the first Jew to hold that position.

Biography

Early years

Bernard Goldsmith was born November 20, 1832, in Munich, Kingdom of Bavaria. He emigrated to New York City with his brother Solomon at the age of 15, working in the city as an apprentice to a watchmaker.

Goldsmith subsequently came west, working for a time in California as a stevedore before starting his own jewelry store.

Business life

Goldsmith's jewelry store was a prosperous one and he began to expand his business empire, opening three stores in Northern California and Southern Oregon. He moved to Portland in 1861, where he opened a mercantile store together with some of his seven brothers. He also began to engage in speculative investments, playing the currency market, speculating on wheat and cattle, and making investments in Idaho mines.

In 1864, Goldsmith became one of the original directors of the Library Association of Portland, founded in that year. Goldsmith was also a backer of the Willamette River Navigation Company, as well as the Willamette Falls Locks and Canal Company, which was responsible for building the Willamette Falls Locks. He was one of twelve founding members of the elite Portland Stock and Exchange Board in 1865.

These commercial ventures proved successful until by the time he was elected mayor in 1869, Goldsmith was the 8th richest resident of Portland and was regarded as the "most prosperous Jew in Oregon."

Political career

He was a Democrat before the Civil War, then shifted to the Republican party in opposition to slavery and in support of Abraham Lincoln, following the national pattern. He ran for mayor on the Union (Republican) ticket, then switched back to the Democratic party in 1875.

He was Portland's first Jewish mayor. He was part of a group of successful early Jews in Portland who exhibited a strong sense of public responsibility and appetite for public life, along with another of Portland's early mayors, Philip Wasserman.

His accomplishments include adding downtown park blocks and public squares to the city's domain, and in 1871, purchasing 40 wooded acres in the hills above downtown Portland, which would become the nucleus of what is now Washington Park. The $32,000 price drew considerable criticism. Goldsmith was the driving force behind the building of locks to navigate around the Willamette River falls across from Oregon City, which allowed boats to travel from the Pacific Ocean to Eugene, Oregon, cutting the cost of shipping Willamette Valley goods to Portland by half. Goldsmith and his associates obtained a $200,000 legislative grant from the state of Oregon for the project; when cost estimates more than doubled, Goldsmith paid an additional $200,000 out of his pocket.

Death and legacy

Bernard Goldsmith died on July 22, 1901. He was 68 years old at the time of his death.

Goldsmith's term of office has been memorialized as "one of the more successful in Portland history" by Oregon historian E. Kimbark MacColl.

Footnotes

Further reading

 Joseph Gaston, "Bernard Goldsmith," in Portland, Oregon: Its History and Builders: Volume 3. Chicago: S. J. Clarke Publishing Co., 1911; p. 167.
 Jewel Lansing, Portland: People Politics and Power 1851-2001. Corvallis, OR: Oregon State University Press, 2005.
 Steven Lowenstein, The Jews of Oregon, 1850-1950. Portland, OR: Jewish Historical Society of Oregon, 1987.
 E. Kimbark MacColl with Harry H. Stein, Merchants, Money, and Power: The Portland Establishment, 1843-1913. Portland, OR: The Georgian Press, 1988.

Mayors of Portland, Oregon
People from Munich
1832 births
1901 deaths
Jewish American people in Oregon politics
Jewish mayors of places in the United States
Jews and Judaism in Portland, Oregon
Oregon Democrats
Oregon Republicans
Willamette River Transportation Company
German emigrants to the United States
19th-century American politicians